Platov was the name of noble family of Don Cossacks origin. Descendants of Count Matvei Ivanovich Platov.

Notable members 

 Matvei Platov (1751–1818), was born in Starocherkassk. Was a general who commanded the Don Cossacks in the Napoleonic wars, upon Alexander I's accession to the throne, he was appointed Ataman of the Don Cossacks. In 1805, he ordered the Cossack capital to be moved from Starocherkassk to a new location, known as Novocherkassk. Count of the Russian Empire in 1812. Platov later accompanied emperor Alexander to London where he was awarded a golden sword and an honorary degree of Low by the University of Oxford (1814).
 Ivan Platov II (born. 1796). Youngest of Matvei Platovs sons. Colonel of Don Cossacks in Napoleonic Wars.

References

External links
Platov in Napoleonic wars
Biography of Platov
 Shumkov, A.A., Ryklis, I.G. List of noble families of the Don Cossacks in alphabetical order. VIRD Publ House, Sankt-Peterburg. 2000, 

Don Cossacks noble families
Russian noble families